The Copa CONMEBOL was an annual football cup competition  organized by CONMEBOL between 1992 and 1999 for South American football clubs. During its time of existence, it was a very prestigious South American club football contest, similar to the UEFA Cup. Clubs qualified for the competition based on their performance in their national leagues and cup competitions. Teams that were not able to qualify for the Copa Libertadores would play in this tournament. The tournament was played as a knockout cup. The tournament ended in 1999, following the expansion of the Copa Libertadores to 32 teams. The Copa Mercosur and Copa Merconorte, which both started in 1998, replaced the Copa CONMEBOL; both cups would later be merged in the current Copa Sudamericana.

The last champion of the competition was Talleres, while Atlético Mineiro is the most successful club in the cup history, having won the tournament two times. The cup was won by seven different clubs but it was never won consecutively.

Format

Qualification
Each national association was assigned a number of entries determined by CONMEBOL which changed slightly from one edition to another. The best teams from the previous season that did not qualify for the Copa Libertadores through their league qualified for the Copa CONMEBOL. The tournament itself was played in two-legged knockout stages. The champion of the Copa CONMEBOL disputed the Recopa Sudamericana, the Copa de Oro and the Copa Master de CONMEBOL, albeit irregularly.

Tournament
The tournament started in the first stage in which 16 clubs were paired in a series of two-legged knockout ties in the round of 16, the first of four stages that worked on a single elimination phase knockout system that culminated in the finals. During each stage of the tournament, ties were decided on points, followed by goal difference, away goals, then a penalty shootout after full-time of the second leg, if necessary.

List of champions

Finals

Performances by club

See also
Copa Sudamericana
Copa Mercosur
Copa Merconorte
Copa Interamericana
Copa Libertadores
Copa Master de CONMEBOL

References

External links

 CONMEBOL Cup at RSSSF
 Información sobre la Copa Conmebol
 Globo Esporte

 
Defunct CONMEBOL club competitions
Recurring sporting events established in 1992
Recurring events disestablished in 1999